

Events

Pre-1600
 475 – Romulus Augustulus is proclaimed Western Roman Emperor.
 683 – During the Siege of Mecca, the Kaaba catches fire and is burned down.
 802 – Empress Irene is deposed and banished to Lesbos. Conspirators place Nikephoros, the minister of finance, on the Byzantine throne.
 932 – Abbasid caliph al-Muqtadir is killed while fighting against the forces of general Mu'nis al-Muzaffar. Al-Muqtadir's brother al-Qahir is chosen to succeed him.
1517 – Protestant Reformation: Martin Luther posts his 95 Theses on the door of the Castle Church in Wittenberg.
1587 – Leiden University Library opens its doors after its founding in 1575.

1601–1900
1822 – Emperor Agustín de Iturbide attempts to dissolve the Congress of the Mexican Empire.
1863 – The New Zealand Wars resume as British forces in New Zealand led by General Duncan Cameron begin their Invasion of the Waikato.
1864 – Nevada is admitted as the 36th U.S. state.
1895 – The strongest earthquake in the Midwestern United States since 1812 strikes near Charleston, Missouri, causing damage and killing at least two.

1901–present
1903 – The Purdue Wreck, a railroad train collision in Indianapolis, kills 17 people, including 14 players of the Purdue University football team.
1907 – The Parliament of Finland approved the Prohibition Act, but the law was not implemented because it was not ratified by Tsar Nicholas II of Russia.
1913 – Dedication of the Lincoln Highway, the first automobile highway across United States.
  1913   – The Indianapolis Streetcar Strike and subsequent riot begins.
1917 – World War I: Battle of Beersheba: The "last successful cavalry charge in history".
1918 – World War I: The Aster Revolution terminates the Austro-Hungarian Compromise of 1867, and Hungary achieves full sovereignty.
1922 – Benito Mussolini is made Prime Minister of Italy
1923 – The first of 160 consecutive days of 100° Fahrenheit at Marble Bar, Western Australia.
1924 – World Savings Day is announced in Milan, Italy by the Members of the Association at the 1st International Savings Bank Congress (World Society of Savings Banks).
1938 – Great Depression: In an effort to restore investor confidence, the New York Stock Exchange unveils a fifteen-point program aimed to upgrade protection for the investing public.
1940 – World War II: The Battle of Britain ends: The United Kingdom prevents a possible German invasion.
1941 – After 14 years of work, Mount Rushmore is completed.
  1941   – World War II: The destroyer  is torpedoed by a German U-boat near Iceland, killing more than 100 U.S. Navy sailors. It is the first U.S. Navy vessel sunk by enemy action in WWII.
1943 – World War II: An F4U Corsair accomplishes the first successful radar-guided interception by a United States Navy or Marine Corps aircraft.
1956 – Suez Crisis: The United Kingdom and France begin bombing Egypt to force the reopening of the Suez Canal.
  1956   – Hungarian Revolution of 1956: A Revolutionary Headquarters is established in Hungary. Following Imre Nagy's announcement of October 30, banned non-Communist political parties are reformed, and the MDP is replaced by the MSZMP.  József Mindszenty is released from prison. The Soviet Politburo makes the decision to crush the Revolution. 
1961 – In the Soviet Union, Joseph Stalin's body is removed from the Lenin's Mausoleum, also known as the Lenin Tomb.
1963 – Indiana State Fairgrounds Coliseum gas explosion: A gas explosion at the Indiana State Fairgrounds Coliseum in Indianapolis kills 81 people and injures another 400 during an ice show.
1968 – Vietnam War October surprise: Citing progress with the Paris peace talks, US President Lyndon B. Johnson announces to the nation that he has ordered a complete cessation of "all air, naval, and artillery bombardment of North Vietnam" effective November 1.
1973 – Mountjoy Prison helicopter escape. Three Provisional Irish Republican Army members escape from Mountjoy Prison, Dublin aboard a hijacked helicopter that landed in the exercise yard.
1979 – Western Airlines Flight 2605 crashes on landing in Mexico City, killing 73 people.
1984 – Indian Prime Minister Indira Gandhi is assassinated by two Sikh security guards. Riots break out in New Delhi and other cities and around 3,000 Sikhs are killed.
1994 – American Eagle Flight 4184 crashes near Roselawn, Indiana killing all 68 people on board.
1996 – TAM Transportes Aéreos Regionais Flight 402 crashes in São Paulo, Brazil, killing 99 people.
1998 – Iraq disarmament crisis begins: Iraq announces it would no longer cooperate with United Nations weapons inspectors.
1999 – Yachtsman Jesse Martin returns to Melbourne after 11 months of circumnavigating the world, solo, non-stop and unassisted.
  1999   – EgyptAir Flight 990 crashes into the Atlantic Ocean near Nantucket, killing all 217 people on board.
2000 – Soyuz TM-31 launches, carrying the first resident crew to the International Space Station. The ISS has been crewed continuously since then.
  2000   – Singapore Airlines Flight 006 crashes on takeoff from Taipei, killing 83. 
2002 – A federal grand jury in Houston, Texas indicts former Enron chief financial officer Andrew Fastow on 78 counts of wire fraud, money laundering, conspiracy and obstruction of justice related to the collapse of his ex-employer.
2003 – Mahathir bin Mohamad resigns as Prime Minister of Malaysia and is replaced by Deputy Prime Minister Abdullah Ahmad Badawi, marking an end to Mahathir's 22 years in power.
2011 – The global population of humans reaches seven billion. This day is now recognized by the United Nations as the Day of Seven Billion.
2014 – During a test flight, the VSS Enterprise, a Virgin Galactic experimental spaceflight test vehicle, suffers a catastrophic in-flight breakup and crashes in the Mojave Desert, California,
2015 – Metrojet Flight 9268 is bombed over the northern Sinai Peninsula, killing all 224 people on board.
2017 – A truck drives into a crowd in Lower Manhattan, New York City, killing eight people.
2020 – Berlin Brandenburg Airport opens its doors after nearly 10 years of delays due to construction issues and project corruption.

Births

Pre-1600
1345 – Ferdinand I, king of Portugal (d. 1383)
1391 – Edward, King of Portugal (d. 1438)
1424 – Władysław III, king of Poland (d. 1444)
1445 – Hedwig, Abbess of Quedlinburg, Princess-Abbess of Quedlinburg (d. 1511)
1472 – Wang Yangming, Chinese Neo-Confucian scholar (d. 1529)
1542 – Henriette of Cleves, Duchess of Nevers, Countess of Rethel (d. 1601)
1599 – Denzil Holles, 1st Baron Holles, English politician (d. 1680)

1601–1900
1620 – John Evelyn, English gardener and author (d. 1706)
1632 – Johannes Vermeer, Dutch painter (d. 1675)
1636 – Ferdinand Maria, Elector of Bavaria (d. 1679)
1638 – Meindert Hobbema, Dutch painter (d. 1709)
1686 – Senesino, Italian singer and actor (d. 1758)
1692 – Anne Claude de Caylus, French archaeologist and author (d. 1765)
1694 – Yeongjo of Joseon (d. 1776)
1705 – Pope Clement XIV (d. 1774)
1711 – Laura Bassi, Italian physician, physicist, and academic (d. 1778)
1714 – Hedvig Taube, Swedish courtier (d. 1744)
1724 – Christopher Anstey, English author and poet (d. 1805)
1729 – Alonso Núñez de Haro y Peralta, Spanish cleric, Archbishop of Mexico, Viceroy of New Spain (d. 1800)
1737 – James Lovell, American educator and politician (d. 1789)
1760 – Katsushika Hokusai, Japanese artist and printmaker (d. 1849)
1795 – John Keats, English poet (d. 1821)
1815 – Thomas Chapman, English-Australian politician, 5th Premier of Tasmania (d. 1884)
  1815   – Karl Weierstrass, German mathematician and academic (d. 1897)
1825 – Charles Lavigerie, French-Algerian cardinal and academic (d. 1892)
1831 – Paolo Mantegazza, Italian neurologist, physiologist, and anthropologist (d. 1910)
1835 – Adelbert Ames, American general and politician, 27th Governor of Mississippi (d. 1933)
  1835   – Krišjānis Barons, Latvian linguist and author (d. 1923)
  1835   – Adolf von Baeyer, German chemist and academic, Nobel Prize laureate (d. 1917)
1838 – Luís I of Portugal (d. 1889)
1847 – Galileo Ferraris, Italian physicist and engineer (d. 1897)
1848 – Boston Custer, American soldier (d. 1876)
1849 – Marie Louise Andrews, American story writer and journalist  (d. 1891)
1851 – Louise of Sweden (d. 1926)
1856 – Charles Leroux, American balloonist and skydiver (d. 1889)
1858 – Saint Geevarghese Mar Dionysius of Vattasseril, Indian Orthodox Saint (d. 1934)
1860 – Juliette Gordon Low, American scout leader, founded the Girl Scouts of the United States of America (d. 1927)
  1860   – Andrew Volstead, American politician (d. 1947)
1868 – John Weir Troy, American journalist, and politician, 5th Governor of the Territory of Alaska (d. 1942)
1875 – Eugene Meyer, American businessman and publisher (d. 1954)
  1875   – Vallabhbhai Patel, Indian lawyer, freedom fighter and politician, 1st Deputy Prime Minister of India (d. 1950)
1876 – Natalie Clifford Barney, American poet and playwright (d. 1972)
1879 – Karel Hašler, Czech actor, director, and composer (d. 1941)
1880 – Julia Peterkin, American author (d. 1961)
  1880   – Mikhail Tomsky, Soviet politician, member of the Politburo of the Central Committee of the Communist Party of the Soviet Union (d. 1936)
1881 – Toshizō Nishio, Japanese general (d. 1960)
1883 – Marie Laurencin, French painter and illustrator (d. 1956)
  1883   – Anthony Wilding, New Zealand tennis player, cricketer, and soldier (d. 1915)
1887 – Chiang Kai-shek, Chinese general and politician, 1st President of the Republic of China (Taiwan) (d. 1975)
  1887   – Newsy Lalonde, Canadian ice hockey player and lacrosse player (d. 1970)
1888 – Napoleon Lapathiotis, Greek poet and author (d. 1944)
1892 – Alexander Alekhine, Russian chess player and author (d. 1946)
1895 – B. H. Liddell Hart, English soldier, historian, and theorist (d. 1970)
1896 – Ethel Waters, American singer and actress (d. 1977)
1897 – Constance Savery, English author (d. 1999)
1900 – Asbjørg Borgfelt, Norwegian sculptor (d. 1976)

1901–present
1902 – Carlos Drummond de Andrade, Brazilian poet (d. 1987)
  1902   – Julia Lee, American blues singer-songwriter and pianist (d. 1958)
  1902   – Abraham Wald, Jewish-Hungarian mathematician and economist (d. 1950)
1907 – Edgar Sampson, American musician and composer (d. 1973)
1908 – Muriel Duckworth, Canadian activist (d. 2009)
1912 – Dale Evans, American singer-songwriter and actress (d. 2001)
  1912   – Ollie Johnston, American animator and voice actor (d. 2008)
1914 – John Hugenholtz, Dutch engineer and designer (d. 1995)
1915 – Jane Jarvis, American pianist and composer (d. 2010)
1916 – Count Carl Johan Bernadotte of Wisborg (d. 2012)
1917 – William H. McNeill, Canadian-American historian and author (d. 2016)
  1917   – Gordon Steege, Australian soldier and pilot (d. 2013)
1918 – Ian Stevenson, American psychiatrist and academic (d. 2007)
1919 – Daphne Oxenford, English actress (d. 2012)
  1919   – Magnus Wenninger, American mathematician and author (d. 2017)
1920 – Dick Francis, Welsh-Caymanian jockey and author (d. 2010)
  1920   – Joseph Gelineau, French priest and composer (d. 2008)
  1920   – Helmut Newton, German-Australian photographer (d. 2004)
  1920   – Fritz Walter, German footballer (d. 2002)
1922 – Barbara Bel Geddes, American actress (d. 2005)
  1922   – Illinois Jacquet, American saxophonist and composer (d. 2004)
  1922   – Norodom Sihanouk, Cambodian politician, 1st Prime Minister of Cambodia (d. 2012)
1925 – Lawrence A. Cremin, American historian and author (d. 1990)
  1925   – John Pople, English-American chemist and academic, Nobel Prize laureate (d. 2004)
  1925   – Robert B. Rheault, American colonel (d. 2013)
1926 – Jimmy Savile, English radio and television host (d. 2011)
1928 – Andrew Sarris, American critic and educator (d. 2012)
1929 – William Orchard, Australian water polo player and psychiatrist (d. 2014)
  1929   – Bud Spencer, Italian swimmer, actor, and screenwriter (d. 2016)
1930 – Michael Collins, American general, pilot, and astronaut (d. 2021)
  1930   – Booker Ervin, American saxophonist (d. 1970)
1931 – Dan Rather, American journalist
1933 – Phil Goyette, Canadian ice hockey player and coach
  1933   – Iemasa Kayumi, Japanese voice actor (d. 2014)
1935 – Dale Brown, American basketball player and coach
  1935   – Ronald Graham, American mathematician and theorist (d. 2020)
  1935   – David Harvey, English-American geographer and academic
1936 – Michael Landon, American actor, director, producer, and screenwriter (d. 1991)
1937 – Tom Paxton, American folk music singer-songwriter and guitarist
1939 – Tom O'Connor, English actor and game show host (d. 2021)
  1939   – Ron Rifkin, American actor
  1939   – Ali Farka Touré, Malian singer-songwriter and guitarist (d. 2006)
1940 – Craig Rodwell, American businessman and activist, founded the Oscar Wilde Bookshop (d. 1993)
  1940   – Judith Wilcox, Baroness Wilcox, English businesswoman and politician
1941 – Dan Alderson, American scientist and academic (d. 1989)
  1941   – Derek Bell, English race car driver
  1941   – Sally Kirkland, American actress 
  1941   – Werner Krieglstein, Czech-American philosopher and academic
1942 – David Ogden Stiers, American actor (d. 2018)
1943 – Elliott Forbes-Robinson, American race car driver
  1943   – Paul Frampton, English-American physicist and academic
  1943   – Aristotelis Pavlidis, Greek politician, 13th Greek Minister for the Aegean and Island Policy
  1943   – Brian Piccolo, American football player (d. 1970)
1945 – Russ Ballard, English singer-songwriter and guitarist 
  1945   – Brian Doyle-Murray, American actor and comedian
  1945   – Barrie Keeffe, English playwright, screenwriter, and producer (d. 2019)
1946 – Stephen Rea, Irish actor
1947 – Deidre Hall, American actress
  1947   – Frank Shorter, American runner and sportscaster
  1947   – Herman Van Rompuy, Belgian academic and politician, 66th Prime Minister of Belgium
1948 – Michael Kitchen, English actor and producer 
  1948   – Franco Gasparri, Italian actor (d. 1999)
1949 – Mart Helme, Estonian journalist and diplomat
  1949   – Bob Siebenberg, American drummer
  1949   – Alison Wolf, English economist and academic
1950 – John Candy, Canadian actor, producer, and screenwriter (d. 1994)
  1950   – Zaha Hadid, Iraqi-English architect and academic, designed the Bridge Pavilion (d. 2016)
  1950   – Jane Pauley, American journalist
  1950   – Antonio Taguba, Filipino-American general
1951 – Nick Saban, American football player and coach
  1951   – Dave Trembley, American baseball player, coach, and manager
1952 – Bernard Edwards, American bass player, songwriter, and producer (d. 1996)
  1952   – Joe West, American baseball umpire
1953 – John Lucas II, American basketball player and coach
1954 – Mari Okamoto, Japanese actress
  1954   – Ken Wahl, American actor and screenwriter
1955 – Michalis Chrisochoidis, Greek lawyer and politician, Greek Minister of Public Order
  1955   – Susan Orlean, American journalist and author
1956 – Bruce Bawer, American poet and critic
  1956   – Christopher de Leon, Filipino actor, director, producer, and politician
  1956   – Anders Lago, Swedish lawyer and politician
  1956   – Charles Moore, English journalist and author
1957 – Brian Stokes Mitchell, American singer and actor
  1957   – Robert Pollard, American singer-songwriter and guitarist 
1959 – Mats Näslund, Swedish ice hockey player
  1959   – Neal Stephenson, American author
1960 – Arnaud Desplechin, French director, cinematographer, and screenwriter
  1960   – Luis Fortuño, Puerto Rican lawyer and politician, 9th Governor of Puerto Rico
  1960   – Mike Gallego, American baseball player and coach
  1960   – Reza Pahlavi, Crown Prince of Iran 
1961 – Alonzo Babers, American runner and pilot
  1961   – Kate Campbell, American singer-songwriter and guitarist
  1961   – Peter Jackson, New Zealand actor, director, producer, and screenwriter
  1961   – Larry Mullen, Jr., Irish musician, songwriter, and actor 
1962 – Jonathan Borden, American neurosurgeon and academic
  1962   – Anna Geifman, American historian, author, and academic
  1962   – John Giannini, American basketball player and coach
  1962   – Mari Jungstedt, Swedish journalist and author
  1962   – Raphael Rabello, Brazilian guitarist and composer (d. 1995)
  1962   – Dan Wood, Canadian ice hockey player
1963 – Mikkey Dee, Swedish hard rock drummer and musician 
  1963   – Johnny Marr, English singer-songwriter and guitarist 
  1963   – Fred McGriff, American baseball player
  1963   – Dermot Mulroney, American actor
  1963   – Rob Schneider, American actor and comedian
  1963   – Dunga, Brazilian footballer and manager
1964 – Frank Bruni, American journalist and critic
  1964   – Colm Ó Cíosóig, Irish musician
  1964   – Marco van Basten, Dutch footballer and manager
  1964   – Darryl Worley, American country music singer-songwriter and guitarist
1965 – Paul du Toit, South African painter and sculptor (d. 2014)
  1965   – Blue Edwards, American basketball player
  1965   – Ruud Hesp, Dutch footballer 
  1965   – Denis Irwin, Irish footballer and journalist
  1965   – Rob Rackstraw, English voice actor
1966 – Ad-Rock, American rapper, producer, and actor 
  1966   – Koji Kanemoto, Japanese wrestler
  1966   – Annabella Lwin, Anglo-Burmese singer-songwriter and record producer 
  1966   – Mike O'Malley, American actor and comedian
1967 – Vanilla Ice, American rapper, television personality, and real estate investor
  1967   – Buddy Lazier, American race car driver
  1967   – Adam Schlesinger, American bass player, songwriter, and producer (d. 2020)
1968 – Antonio Davis, American basketball player and sportscaster
1970 – Linn Berggren, Swedish singer-songwriter
1971 – Alphonso Ford, American basketball player (d. 2004)
  1971   – Irina Pantaeva, Russian model and actress
1973 – Paul Abrahams, English footballer and coach
  1973   – Christopher Bevins, American voice actor, director, producer, and screenwriter
  1973   – Tim Byrdak, American baseball player
  1973   – David Dellucci, American baseball player and sportscaster
  1973   – Beverly Lynne, American actress
1974 – Muzzy Izzet, English-Turkish footballer
  1974   – Roger Manganelli, Brazilian-American singer-songwriter and bass player 
1975 – Fabio Celestini, Swiss footballer and manager
  1975   – Keith Jardine, American mixed martial artist and actor
  1975   – Johnny Whitworth, American actor and producer
1976 – Guti, Spanish footballer
  1976   – Piper Perabo, American actress and producer
1978 – Inka Grings, German footballer and manager
  1978   – Emmanuel Izonritei, Nigerian boxer
  1978   – Marek Saganowski, Polish footballer
  1978   – Martin Verkerk, Dutch tennis player
1979 – Ricardo Fuller, Jamaican footballer
  1979   – Simão Sabrosa, Portuguese footballer
1980 – Samaire Armstrong, American model, actress, and fashion designer
  1980   – Alondra de la Parra, Mexican-American pianist and conductor
  1980   – Marcel Meeuwis, Dutch footballer
  1980   – Eddie Kaye Thomas, American actor and voice artist 
1981 – Irina Denezhkina, Russian author
  1981   – Steven Hunter, American basketball player
  1981   – Frank Iero, American singer-songwriter and guitarist 
  1981   – Selina Jen, Taiwanese singer and actress 
  1981   – Mike Napoli, American baseball player
1982 – Jordan Bannister, Australian footballer and umpire
  1982   – Justin Chatwin, Canadian actor
  1982   – Tomáš Plekanec, Czech ice hockey player
1983 – Adam Bouska, American photographer and activist, founded the NOH8 Campaign
1984 – Pat Murray, American football player
  1984   – Amanda Pascoe, Australian swimmer
1985 – Fanny Chmelar, German alpine skier
  1985   – Kerron Clement, American hurdler and sprinter
1986 – Chris Alajajian, Australian race car driver
  1986   – Christie Hayes, Australian actress and producer
1987 – Nick Foligno, Canadian ice hockey player
  1987   – Jean-Karl Vernay, French race car driver
1988 – Cole Aldrich, American basketball player
  1988   – Sébastien Buemi, Swiss race car driver
  1988   – Jack Riewoldt, Australian footballer
  1988   – Lizzy Yarnold, British skeleton racer
1990 – JID, American rapper
1993 – Nadine Lustre, Filipino actress and singer
  1993   – Mercedes Arn-Horn, Canadian musician
1995 – Joana Valle Costa, Portuguese tennis player
1997 – Siobhán Bernadette Haughey, Hong Kong-Irish swimmer
  1997   – Marcus Rashford, English footballer
1999 – Léa Serna, French figure skater
2000 – Willow Smith, American singer, actress, and dancer
2005 – Leonor, Princess of Asturias

Deaths

Pre-1600
 932 – Al-Muqtadir, Abbasid caliph (b. 895)
 994 – Wolfgang of Regensburg, German bishop and saint (b. 934)
1005 – Abe no Seimei, Japanese astrologer (b. 921)
1034 – Deokjong, Korean ruler (b. 1016)
1147 – Robert, 1st Earl of Gloucester, son of Henry I of England (b. 1100)
1214 – Eleanor of England, queen consort of Castile (b. 1163)
1320 – Ricold of Monte Croce, Italian Dominican missionary (b. 1242)
1335 – Marie of Évreux, Duchess Consort of Brabant (b. 1303)
1448 – John VIII Palaiologos, Byzantine emperor (b. 1390)
1517 – Fra Bartolomeo, Italian artist (b. 1472)
1589 – Peter Stumpp, German farmer and alleged serial killer (b. 1535)

1601–1900
1641 – Cornelis Jol, Dutch admiral (b. 1597)
1659 – John Bradshaw, English lawyer and judge, Chancellor of the Duchy of Lancaster (b. 1602)
1661 – Köprülü Mehmed Pasha, Ottoman politician, 109th Grand Vizier of the Ottoman Empire (b. 1575)
1723 – Cosimo III de' Medici, Grand Duke of Tuscany (b. 1642)
1732 – Victor Amadeus II, Duke of Savoy (b. 1666)
1733 – Eberhard Louis, Duke of Württemberg (b. 1676)
1744 – Leonardo Leo, Italian composer (b. 1694)
1768 – Francesco Maria Veracini, Italian violinist and composer (b. 1690)
1786 – Princess Amelia of Great Britain (b. 1711)
1806 – Kitagawa Utamaro, Japanese artist and printmaker (b. ca. 1753)
1860 – Thomas Cochrane, 10th Earl of Dundonald, Scottish-English admiral and politician (b. 1775)
1869 – Charles A. Wickliffe, American politician, 14th Governor of Kentucky (b. 1788)
1879 – Jacob Abbott, American author and academic (b. 1803)
  1879   – Joseph Hooker, American general (b. 1814)
1884 – Marie Bashkirtseff, Ukrainian-Russian painter and sculptor (b. 1858)

1901–present
1905 – Bryan O'Loghlen, Irish-Australian politician, 13th Premier of Victoria (b. 1828)
1913 – William Evans-Gordon, English soldier and politician (b. 1857)
1916 – Charles Taze Russell, American minister (b. 1852)
  1916   – Huang Xing, Chinese revolutionary leader and statesman (b. 1874)
1918 – Egon Schiele, Austrian painter (b. 1890)
1920 – Alphonse Desjardins, Canadian businessman (b. 1854)
1925 – Max Linder, French actor, director, and screenwriter (b. 1883)
  1925   – Mikhail Frunze, Bolshevik leader during and just prior to the Russian Revolution of 1917 (b. 1885)
1926 – Harry Houdini, American magician and stuntman (b. 1874)
1929 – António José de Almeida, Portuguese physician and politician, 6th President of Portugal (b. 1866)
1931 – Octave Uzanne, French journalist and author (b. 1851)
1939 – Otto Rank, Austrian psychologist, author, and educator (b. 1884)
1944 – Joseph Hubert Priestley, British botanist (b. 1883)
1952 – Chit Hlaing, Burmese lawyer and politician (b. 1879)
1959 – Jean Cabannes, French physicist and academic (b. 1885)
1960 – H. L. Davis, American author and poet (b. 1894)
1962 – Gabrielle Renaudot Flammarion, French astronomer (b. 1877)
1963 – Mesut Cemil, Turkish cellist and composer (b. 1902)
1972 – Bill Durnan, Canadian ice hockey player and coach (b. 1916)
1973 – Malek Bennabi, Algerian philosopher and author (b. 1905)
1975 – Sachin Dev Burman, Indian composer and singer (b. 1906)
1977 – C. B. Colby, American author and illustrator (b. 1904)
1980 – Jan Werich, Czech actor and playwright (b. 1905)
1983 – George Halas, American football player and coach (b. 1895)
  1983   – Lu Jiaxi, Chinese self-taught mathematician (b. 1935)
  1983   – Sharof Rashidov, Uzbek politician, CPSU Politburo candidate member (b. 1917)
1984 – Eduardo De Filippo, Italian actor, director, and screenwriter (b. 1900)
  1984   – Indira Gandhi, Indian politician, Prime Minister of India (b. 1917)
1985 – Nikos Engonopoulos, Greek painter and poet (b. 1907)
  1985   – Poul Reichhardt, Danish actor and singer (b. 1913)
1986 – Robert S. Mulliken, American physicist and chemist, Nobel Prize laureate (b. 1896)
1988 – John Houseman, Romanian-born American actor, producer, and screenwriter (b. 1902)
  1988   – Alfred Pellan, Canadian painter and academic (b. 1906)
1991 – Joseph Papp, American stage director and producer (b. 1921)
1992 – Gary Rippingale, English ice hockey player (b. 1974)
1993 – Federico Fellini, Italian director and screenwriter (b. 1920)
  1993   – River Phoenix, American actor and singer (b. 1970)
1995 – Rosalind Cash, American actress and singer (b. 1938)
1996 – Marcel Carné, French director and screenwriter (b. 1906)
1998 – Elmer Vasko, Canadian ice hockey player (b. 1935)
  1998   – María de la Purísima Salvat Romero, Spanish nun and saint (Roman Catholic Church) (b. 1926)
1999 – Greg Moore, Canadian race car driver (b. 1975)
2000 – Ring Lardner, Jr., American journalist and screenwriter (b. 1915)
  2000   – Kazuki Watanabe, Japanese songwriter and guitarist (b. 1981)
2001 – Régine Cavagnoud, French skier (b. 1970)
2002 – Lionel Poilâne, French banker and businessman (b. 1945)
  2002   – Michail Stasinopoulos, Greek jurist and politician, President of Greece (b. 1903)
  2002   – Raf Vallone, Italian footballer and actor (b. 1916)
2003 – Richard Neustadt, American political scientist and historian (b. 1919)
2005 – Hal Anger, American biophysicist and engineer (b. 1920)
  2005   – Amrita Pritam, Indian author and poet (b. 1919)
2006 – P. W. Botha, South African soldier and politician, State President of South Africa (b. 1916)
  2006   – Peter Fryer, English journalist and author (b. 1927)
2007 – Erdal İnönü, Turkish physicist and politician, Prime Minister of Turkey (b. 1926)
2008 – Studs Terkel, American historian and author (b. 1912)
2009 – Mustafa Mahmud, Egyptian physician and author (b. 1921)
  2009   – Tom Wheatcroft, English businessman, founded the Donington Grand Prix Exhibition (b. 1922)
  2009   – Qian Xuesen, Chinese aerodynamicist and academic (b. 1911)
2010 – Ted Sorensen, American lawyer, 8th White House Counsel (b. 1928)
2011 – Flórián Albert, Hungarian footballer and manager (b. 1941)
  2011   – Roberto Lippi, Italian race car driver (d. 1926)
2012 – Gae Aulenti,  Italian architect and designer (b. 1927)
  2012   – John Fitch, American race car driver and engineer (b. 1917)
  2012   – John H. Reed, American soldier and politician, 67th Governor of Maine (b. 1921)
2013 – Chris Chase, American actress and author (b. 1924)
  2013   – Gérard de Villiers, French journalist and author (b. 1929)
  2013   – Trevor Kletz, English chemist and author (b. 1922)
  2013   – Johnny Kucks, American baseball player (b. 1933)
  2013   – Andres Narvasa, Filipino lawyer and jurist, 19th Chief Justice of the Supreme Court of the Philippines (b. 1928)
  2013   – Bobby Parker, American singer-songwriter and guitarist (b. 1937)
2014 – David Manker Abshire, American commander and diplomat, United States Permanent Representative to NATO (b. 1926)
  2014   – Michael Alsbury, American engineer and pilot (b. 1975)
  2014   – Brad Halsey, American baseball player (b. 1981)
  2014   – Hitoshi Motoshima, Japanese educator and politician (b. 1922)
2015 – Gus Savage, American businessman and politician (b. 1925)
2018 – Willie McCovey, American baseball player (b. 1938)
2020 – MF Doom, British-American rapper and record producer (b. 1971)
2020 – Sean Connery, Scottish actor (b. 1930)

Holidays and observances
Christian feast day:
Alphonsus Rodriguez
Ampliatus
Begu
Erc of Slane (in Cornwall)
Foillan (in Namur)
Martin Luther (Anglican Communion)
Paul Shinji Sasaki and Philip Lindel Tsen (Episcopal Church)
Quentin
Blessed Theodore Romzha (Ruthenian Catholic Church)
Wolfgang of Regensburg
October 31 (Eastern Orthodox liturgics)
Día de la Canción Criolla (Peru)
Earliest day on which All Saints Day can fall, while November 6 is the latest; celebrated on Saturday between October 31 and November 6 (Finland, Sweden)
Halloween and related celebrations:
Allantide (Cornwall)
Halloween (Ireland, Canada, United Kingdom, United States and other places)
Hop-tu-Naa (Isle of Man)
Samhain in the Northern Hemisphere, Beltane in the Southern Hemisphere; begins on sunset of October 31 (Gaels, Welsh people and Neopagan Wheel of the Year)
The first day of the Day of the Dead, celebrated until November 2 (Mexico)
Girl Scouts Founders Day (United States)
King Father's Birthday (Cambodia)
National Unity Day (India)
Reformation Day (Slovenia, parts of Germany, Chile, various Protestant churches with a particular emphasis in Lutheran and Reformed ones)
Saci Day (Brazil)

References

External links

 
 
 

Days of the year
October